Renato Dionisi (born 21 November 1947) is an Italian former pole vaulter. He was born in Riva del Garda.

Biography
He won five medals at the International athletics competitions. He represented his country twice at the Olympic Games (1964, 1972) and was a three-time participant at the European Athletics Championships (1966, 1969, 1971) and was a bronze medallist there on his last appearance. At the European Athletics Indoor Championships he was gold medallist in 1973 and bronze medallist three years later. He won minor medals at the Mediterranean Games on two occasions and was the 1975 Summer Universiade bronze medallist.

Dionisi has 47 caps for the Italy national athletics team (from 1964 to 1978). In his career he won the Italian Athletics Championships twelve times – ten times outdoors and twice indoors. He was also a winner as a guest at the AAA Championships.

International competitions

National titles
10 wins in pole vault at the Italian Athletics Championships (1964, 1965, 1966, 1967, 1968, 1969, 1970, 1971, 1977, 1978)
2 wins in pole vault at the Italian Athletics Indoor Championships (1971, 1973)
1 win in pole vault at the AAA Championships

See also
List of European Athletics Championships medalists (men)
List of European Athletics Indoor Championships medalists (men)
 Italy national athletics team - Most caps

References

External links
 

1947 births
Living people
Sportspeople from Trentino
Italian male pole vaulters
Olympic athletes of Italy
Athletes (track and field) at the 1964 Summer Olympics
Athletes (track and field) at the 1972 Summer Olympics
European Athletics Championships medalists
Mediterranean Games silver medalists for Italy
Mediterranean Games bronze medalists for Italy
Athletes (track and field) at the 1967 Mediterranean Games
Athletes (track and field) at the 1975 Mediterranean Games
Universiade medalists in athletics (track and field)
Mediterranean Games medalists in athletics
Universiade bronze medalists for Italy
Medalists at the 1975 Summer Universiade
20th-century Italian people